In functional analysis, a branch of mathematics, a Beppo Levi space, named after Beppo Levi, is a certain space of generalized functions.

The Beppo Levi space is

where  denotes the Sobolev semi-norm.

An alternative definition is as follows: let  such that

 

and define:

Then  is the Beppo-Levi space.

References
 Wendland, Holger (2005), Scattered Data Approximation, Cambridge University Press.
 Rémi Arcangéli; María Cruz López de Silanes; Juan José Torrens (2007), "An extension of a bound for functions in Sobolev spaces, with applications to (m,s)-spline interpolation and smoothing" Numerische Mathematik
 Rémi Arcangéli; María Cruz López de Silanes; Juan José Torrens (2009), "Estimates for functions in Sobolev spaces defined on unbounded domains" Journal of Approximation Theory

External links
 L. Brasco, D. Gómez-Castro, J.L. Vázquez, Characterisation of homogeneous fractional Sobolev spaces https://link.springer.com/content/pdf/10.1007/s00526-021-01934-6.pdf 
 J. Deny, J.L. Lions, Les espaces du type de Beppo-Levy https://aif.centre-mersenne.org/item/10.5802/aif.55.pdf
 R. Adams, J. Fournier, Sobolev Spaces (2003), Academic press -- Theorem 4.31

Functional analysis